Sobarocephala quadrimaculata is a species of fly in the family Clusiidae.

References

Clusiidae
Articles created by Qbugbot
Insects described in 1963